Raincliffe School was a comprehensive secondary school, with Business and Enterprise College status, in Scarborough, North Yorkshire, England. On 31 August 2012, Raincliffe School formally closed, entering a federation with nearby Graham School.

For many years the school held an annual fell run, called the Muddy Rut, in which the entire student roll would race through Raincliffe Woods.

On 23 June 2017, the Raincliffe school site (Graham lower school) closed due to falling pupil numbers.

Notable alumni
 John Fendley, aka Fenners – TV presenter, mostly known for hosting Soccer AM
 Robert Horwell – played Nick Neeson in Coronation Street
 Sophia Wardman – singer, part of the group Belle Amie; appeared on Shipwrecked TV reality show
 Sir Gavin Williamson – MP, was Secretary of State for Defence from November 2017 until May 2019. He was subsequently Secretary of State for Education from July 2019 until September 2021.

References

Schools in Scarborough, North Yorkshire
Defunct schools in North Yorkshire
Educational institutions disestablished in 2012
2012 disestablishments in England